Powell v. Alabama, 287 U.S. 45 (1932), was a landmark United States Supreme Court decision in which the Court reversed the convictions of nine young black men for allegedly raping two white women on a freight train near Scottsboro, Alabama. The majority of the Court reasoned that the right to retain and be represented by a lawyer was fundamental to a fair trial and that at least in some circumstances, the trial judge must inform a defendant of this right. In addition, if the defendant cannot afford a lawyer, the court must appoint one sufficiently far in advance of trial to permit the lawyer to prepare adequately for the trial.

Powell was the first time the Court had reversed a state criminal conviction for a violation of a criminal procedural provision of the United States Bill of Rights. In effect, it held that the Fourteenth Amendment Due Process Clause included at least part of the right to counsel referred to in the Sixth Amendment, making that much of the Bill of Rights binding on the states. Before Powell, the Court had reversed state criminal convictions only for racial discrimination in jury selection — a practice that violated the Equal Protection Clause of the Fourteenth Amendment.

Background of the case 
In March 1931, nine black men—Charlie Weems, Ozie Powell, Clarence Norris, Olen Montgomery, Willie Roberson, Haywood Patterson, Andrew (Andy) Wright, Leroy (Roy) Wright and Eugene Williams, later known as the Scottsboro Boys—were accused of raping two young white women, Ruby Bates and Victoria Price.

The group of young black men were on a freight train with seven white men and two women. A fight broke out, and all of the white men were thrown from the train. The women accused the black men of rape, although one woman later retracted her claim. All the defendants, except for 13-year-old Roy Wright, were sentenced to death in a series of three one-day trials. The defendants, who were under military guard to protect them from any mob violence, were not told they could hire lawyers or even contact their families. They had no access to a lawyer until shortly before trial, leaving little or no time to plan the defense. They appealed their convictions on the grounds that the group was not provided adequate legal counsel. The Alabama Supreme Court ruled 7-2 that the trial was fair. Chief Justice John C. Anderson wrote a strongly worded dissenting opinion. The defendants appealed the Alabama Supreme Court's ruling to the U.S. Supreme Court.

The Supreme Court reversed and remanded, holding that due process had been violated. Writing for himself and six other Justices, Justice Sutherland explained the Court's ruling as follows:
In the light of the ... ignorance and illiteracy of the defendants, their youth, the circumstances of public hostility, the imprisonment and the close surveillance of the defendants by the military forces, the fact that their friends and families were all in other states and communication with them necessarily difficult, and above all that they stood in deadly peril of their lives—we think the failure of the trial court to give them reasonable time and opportunity to secure counsel was a clear denial of due process.
But passing that, and assuming their inability, even if opportunity had been given, to employ counsel, ... under the circumstances just stated, the necessity of counsel was so vital and imperative that the failure of the trial court to make an effective appointment of counsel was likewise a denial of due process within the meaning of the Fourteenth Amendment.
The Court's holding was quite limited. Justice Sutherland cautioned that
Whether this would be so in other criminal prosecutions, or under other circumstances, we need not determine. All that it is necessary now to decide, as we do decide, is that in a capital case, where the defendant is unable to employ counsel, and is incapable adequately of making his own defense because of ignorance, feeble-mindedness, illiteracy, or the like, it is the duty of the court, whether requested or not, to assign counsel for him as a necessary requisite of due process of law; and that duty is not discharged by an assignment at such a time or under such circumstances as to preclude the giving of effective aid in the preparation and trial of the case. ... In a case such as this, whatever may be the rule in other cases, the right to have counsel appointed, when necessary, is a logical corollary from the constitutional right to be heard by counsel.

Subsequent jurisprudence
Whether Powell v. Alabama applied to non-capital cases sparked heated debate. Betts v. Brady initially decided that, unless there were special circumstances such as illiteracy or a complicated trial, there was no need for a court-appointed attorney. That decision was ultimately overturned in Gideon v. Wainwright, which established the right of an indigent felony defendant to be provided a trial attorney. Later Supreme Court cases have considered how early in the criminal process this right attaches, whether it applies to misdemeanors, and whether it applies to appeals from convictions.

See also
 List of United States Supreme Court cases, volume 287
 Continuance
 Norris v. Alabama (1935)

Notes

External links
 
 

African-American history of Alabama
United States Supreme Court cases
United States Supreme Court cases of the Hughes Court
United States Sixth Amendment appointment of counsel case law
1932 in United States case law
United States death penalty case law
Capital punishment in Alabama
American Civil Liberties Union litigation
Incorporation case law
Legal history of Alabama
1932 in Alabama
Jackson County, Alabama
Rape in the United States
African-American history between emancipation and the civil rights movement
Civil rights movement case law